Maldwyn D. Hughes (October 13, 1921 – March 18, 1995) was a Canadian ice hockey player with the Lethbridge Maple Leafs. He won a gold medal at the 1951 World Ice Hockey Championships in Paris, France. The 1951 Lethbridge Maple Leafs team was inducted to the Alberta Sports Hall of Fame in 1974.

References

1921 births
1995 deaths
Canadian ice hockey goaltenders
Ice hockey people from Winnipeg